The FIS Nordic Junior and U23 World Ski Championships 2009 took place in Praz de Lys-Sommand, France and Štrbské Pleso, Slovakia from 29 January to 6 February 2009. It was the 32nd Junior World Championships and the 4th Under-23 World Championships in nordic skiing.

Medal summary

Junior events

Cross-country skiing

Nordic Combined

Ski jumping

Under-23 events

Cross-country skiing

Medal table

References 

2009
2009 in cross-country skiing
2009 in ski jumping
Junior World Ski Championships
2009 in youth sport
International sports competitions hosted by France
International sports competitions hosted by Slovakia